Chālco  was a complex pre-Columbian Nahua altepetl or confederacy in central Mexico. It was divided into the four sub-altepetl of Tlalmanalco/Tlacochcalco, Amaquemecan, Tenanco Texopalco Tepopolla and Chimalhuacan-Chalco, which were themselves further subdivided into altepetl tlayacatl, each with its own tlatoani (king). Its inhabitants were known as the Chālcatl  (singular) or Chālcah  (plural).

In the 14th and early 15th centuries, flower wars were fought between the Chalca and the Aztecs. Serious war erupted in 1446. According to the Amaqueme historian Chimalpahin, this was because the Chalca refused a Mexica demand to contribute building materials for the temple of Huitzilopochtli. Chalco was finally conquered by the Aztecs under Moctezuma I in or around 1465, and the kings of Chalco were exiled to Huexotzinco. The rulerships were restored by Tizoc in 1486, who installed new tlatoque. This was achieved, in part, by the diplomacy work carried out by the Chalcan musician Quecholcohuatl when he performed a politically-driven composition for Axayacatl in 1479. This story was recorded by Chimalpahin in the seventh of his Eight Relations (see The liberation of Chalco). Chalco paid more tribute to Tenochtitlan in the form of food than any other region in the Valley of Mexico, probably because of its fertile soil and location.

The Spanish conquistadors Pedro de Alvarado and Bernardino Vázquez de Tapia reached Chalco in the fall of 1519. The Chalca allied with the Spaniards and participated in the defeat of the Aztecs. Hernán Cortés claimed Chalco for himself as an encomienda, but failed to maintain his possession of it. Chalco was designated a corregimiento by 1533. Several places outside the traditional region of Chalco were added to it in colonial times.

See also
Chalco de Díaz Covarrubias, current municipality, home to ancient Chalco altepetl and part of Greater Mexico City.
Valle de Chalco Solidaridad, municipality, part of Greater Mexico City.

References

States and territories established in the 13th century
Complex altepetl
1521 disestablishments in North America
Indigenous peoples in Mexico
Spanish conquests in the Americas
13th-century establishments in North America
Former countries in North America
Former empires in the Americas